Vicente Garrido Genovés (Valencia, Spain, 1958) is a Spanish criminologist, psychologist and writer. His main fields of specialization are criminal psychology, criminal profiling and juvenile delinquency. He is also a prolific TV guest, known by his appearances in shows like Informe Semanal in RTVE, Espejo Público in Antena 3 and Cuarto Milenio in Cuatro, as well as in press and radio. Garrido is also a crime fiction writer in partnership with Nieves Abarca.

Career
Garrido graduated in criminology by the Complutense University of Madrid in 1980 and later doctored in psychology in the University of Valencia, of which he would become a professor and researcher in the fields of evolutive criminology, criminal investigation, offender profiling and prevention of juvenile delinquency. He added a postgraduate in the Ottawa University in Canada in 1986, and in 1991 he worked as a teacher at University of Salford in United Kingdom, as well as professor of criminal law in the Spanish National University of Distance Education.

He is part of the board of the specialized magazines Psychology, Crime & Law and Journal of Correctional Education.

Between 1997 and 1999 worked as a consultant for the United Nations for prevention of juvenile delinquency in Hispanic America. He was also a consultant for the General Secretary of Penitentiary Institutions in Spain, and was part of the commission in charge of the Ley Reguladora de Responsabilidad Jurídica del Menor, approved in 2000.

He is also a crime fiction writer, working in partnership with fellow criminal expert Nieves Abarca. They debuted in 2012 with the novel Crímenes exquisitos, the beginning of an ongoing series of five installments.

Bibliography

Non-fiction
 
  - with Ana María Gómez Piñana
  - with Ana María Gómez Piñana
  - with Per Stangeland and Santiago Redondo Illescas
 
 
 
 
 
  - with María Jesús López Latorre and José Luis Alba Robles

Fiction
  - with Nieves Abarca
  - with Nieves Abarca
  - with Nieves Abarca
  - with Nieves Abarca
  - with Nieves Abarca

Awards
 Cross of the Order of Saint Raymond of Peñafort (1999)
 Rafael Salillas Award (2014) by Spanish Society of Criminological Investigation

References

External links
 Order of Saint Raymond of Peñafort

Spanish criminologists
Spanish psychologists
Spanish male novelists
Science communicators
Ottawa University alumni
1958 births
Living people